Park Ji-woo (born 27 October 1998) is a South Korean speed skater. She competed in the 2018 Winter Olympics.

References

 
 

1998 births
Living people
Speed skaters at the 2018 Winter Olympics
Speed skaters at the 2022 Winter Olympics
South Korean female speed skaters
Olympic speed skaters of South Korea
Asian Games medalists in speed skating
Speed skaters at the 2017 Asian Winter Games
Asian Games silver medalists for South Korea
Medalists at the 2017 Asian Winter Games
Speed skaters at the 2016 Winter Youth Olympics
Youth Olympic gold medalists for South Korea
Competitors at the 2023 Winter World University Games
Medalists at the 2023 Winter World University Games
21st-century South Korean women
Universiade medalists in speed skating
Universiade gold medalists for South Korea
Universiade silver medalists for South Korea